The football sporting event at the 1917 Far Eastern Championship Games was contested by three nations; Philippines, China and football debutant and hosts Japan. China was represented by South China A.A. and Japan was represented by a selection from the Tokyo Higher Normal School.

Results

Note: While the Philippines were ranked second, this is debatable, since they withdrew after causing a brawl that led to the abandonment of their match against China.

At least one milestone was reached, aside from the record scoreline made in this match: Haruyoshi Fujii became Japan's first goalscorer in an international competitive football match by scoring Japan's two goals.

The match was abandoned in the 55th minute with China leading 3–0. After Cheung had scored China's third goal from a penalty, the Filipino goalkeeper punched Cheung in the face, sparking a brawl which was broken up by match officials and police: consequently, the Philippines had several players (including the goalkeeper) sent off, and withdrew from the tournament.

Winner

Statistics

Goalscorers

References

1917 in Japan
Football at the Far Eastern Championship Games
International association football competitions hosted by Japan
1917 in Asian football
1917 in Japanese sport